Poneridia is a genus of skeletonizing leaf beetles in the family Chrysomelidae. There are at least seven described species in Poneridia, found in Australasia and Indomalaya.

Species
These seven species belong to the genus Poneridia:
 Poneridia australis (Boheman, 1859) 
 Poneridia elegans (Blackburn, 1890) 
 Poneridia lugens (Blackburn, 1896) 
 Poneridia macdonaldi (Lea, 1895) 
 Poneridia quadrinotata (Blackburn, 1890) 
 Poneridia richmondensis (Blackburn, 1896) 
 Poneridia semipullata (Clark, 1864)  (figleaf beetle)

References

Galerucinae
Chrysomelidae genera
Taxa named by Julius Weise